The Sports Illustrated Swimsuit Model Search was a reality television show produced by NBC that debuted in January 2005, prior to the launch of that year's Sports Illustrated Swimsuit Issue in February.

Premise 
The show documented twelve previously unknown fashion models as they competed against one another for a pictorial in the 2005 edition of the Sports Illustrated Swimsuit Issue in addition to a modeling contract with NEXT Model Management worth 1 million dollars.

The twelve contestants were chosen after NBC and Sports Illustrated launched a nationwide search of 3,000 women. The finalists were judged on their photo shoots as well fitness tests.

The show's tagline was "The business of being beautiful is about to get ugly."

Judges 

Roshumba Williams, former Sports Illustrated Swimsuit Model
Joel Wilkenfeld, president of NEXT Model Management
Jule Campbell, founder of the SI Swimsuit Issue and former editor

Contestants 
(In order of elimination)

Week 1 - Come As You Are
Marcela Ziemiansk
Nancy Stelmaszcyzk
Sabrina Sikora
Shantel VanSanten

Week 2 - 70s Shoot
Adaora Akubilo
Stella Diaz

Week 3 - Freeze Frame
Krisi Ballentine
Betti Formeus

Week 4 - Runway
Jenna Spilde

Week 5 - Final Shoot
Stacy Klimek
Shannon Hughes (runner-up)
Alicia Hall (winner)

Sports Illustrated Swim Search

In 2017, the issue hosted its first ever open casting call where aspirants were asked to submit a 60-second video via Instagram. The three-part series called Sports Illustrated Swim Search which documented the first ever open casting call with Camille Kostek as a winner (becoming a cover model in 2019) premiered on SI TV and Amazon Prime Video in February 2018. The following year, the model search held an in-person open casting call in Miami, and has been held annually since. The 2019 show of finalists was characterized as the magazine's most diverse group of models in its history, featuring among others 55-year-old model Kathy Jacobs, alopecia sufferer Christie Valdiserri, and plus-sized model Ashley Alexiss.

See also
List of Sports Illustrated Swimsuit Issue cover models
List of Sports Illustrated Swimsuit Issue models

References

External links 
 

2005 American television series debuts
2005 American television series endings
2000s American reality television series
Modeling-themed reality television series
Sports Illustrated Swimsuit Issue